Leiocephalus stictigaster, commonly known as the Cuban striped curlytail or Cabo Corrientes curlytail lizard, is a species of lizard in the family Leiocephalidae (curly-tailed lizard). It is native to Cuba.

References

Leiocephalus
Reptiles described in 1959
Reptiles of Cuba
Taxa named by Albert Schwartz (zoologist)
Endemic fauna of Cuba